Anna Maxwell Martin (born Anna Charlotte Martin; 27 May 1977), sometimes credited as Anna Maxwell-Martin, is a British actress. She won two British Academy Television Awards, for her portrayals of Esther Summerson in the BBC adaptation of Bleak House (2005) and N in the Channel 4 adaptation of Poppy Shakespeare (2008). She is also known for her roles as DCS Patricia Carmichael in BBC One crime drama Line of Duty (2019–present) and Kelly Major in Code 404 (2020–present). Since 2016, Martin has starred in the BBC comedy Motherland, for which she was nominated for the BAFTA Award for Best Female Comedy Performance.

Her theatre work includes the role of Lyra Belacqua in the production of His Dark Materials (2003–2004) at the National Theatre.

Early life and education
Anna Charlotte Martin was born in Beverley on 27 May 1977 to Rosalind (née Youngson) and Ivan Martin. Her father was managing director of a pharmaceutical company and her mother was a research scientist. Her mother gave up her job to bring up Anna and her elder brother, Adam. She attended Beverley High School, where she appeared in school plays. After she left school, Martin studied history at Liverpool University.

Martin joined the London Academy of Music and Dramatic Art (LAMDA) after completing her studies at Liverpool. She added the name Maxwell (her maternal grandfather's first name) to her name to distinguish her from another member with the same name when she joined Equity. In 2022, Martin appeared on an episode of Who Do You Think You Are?, and said that Maxwell is a middle name and not part of her surname.

Career
Martin made her professional stage debut in 2001, in The Little Foxes at the Donmar Theatre, London. She first came to prominence on the London stage playing the leading role of Lyra in the National Theatre's production of Philip Pullman's His Dark Materials. She was then cast in the part of Bessie Higgins in the BBC television adaptation Elizabeth Gaskell's novel North and South in 2004, and made a guest appearance in the 2005 series of Doctor Who. She played Esther Summerson, the central character in the 2005 BBC adaptation of Charles Dickens's Bleak House, for which she won the Best Actress BAFTA Television Award in 2006.

In January 2006, Martin took part in a reading of The Entertainer at the Royal Court Theatre, and in February and March she appeared in Laura Wade's Other Hands, directed by Bijan Sheibani at the Soho Theatre. She is the narrator of the CD version of The Foreshadowing, a children's book about the First World War by Marcus Sedgwick, which was published in May 2006. In the same year she worked on I Really Hate My Job, directed by Oliver Parker and, from October 2006 to April 2007, played Sally Bowles in Bill Kenwright and Rufus Norris's West End production of Cabaret at the Lyric Theatre.

She played Cassandra Austen in Becoming Jane, a 2007 film about the early life of the novelist Jane Austen, starring American actress Anne Hathaway in the title role. At the end of the year she played the gaoler's daughter in Lee Hall's adaptation of The Wind in the Willows, a multimillion-pound production by Box TV for BBC One, and was the joint narrator (with Anton Lesser) of the CD version of Tamar, a children's book about the Second World War by Mal Peet, which was published in December 2007.

In 2008, she starred in the BBC Two drama White Girl and with Naomie Harris in Channel 4's adaptation of Poppy Shakespeare, for which she won her second Best Actress BAFTA Television Award in 2009.

From July to October of that year, she appeared with Dame Eileen Atkins in The Female of the Species at the Vaudeville Theatre in London. She also appeared in a BBC Radio 4 adaptation of Agatha Christie's novel Crooked House. In July 2009 she appeared in the BBC Two drama Freefall, and played Neil Armstrong's wife, Janet, in Moonshot: The Flight of Apollo 11, an ITV1 drama documentary to celebrate the 40th anniversary of the Apollo 11 moon landing.

In February 2010, she played freedom of information campaigner Heather Brooke in On Expenses, a BBC Four satirical drama, and later played Isabella in Shakespeare's Measure For Measure alongside Rory Kinnear at the Almeida Theatre.

In February 2011, she played Sarah Burton in a three-part BBC adaptation of Winifred Holtby's novel South Riding. On 12 July 2011, she played Kay Langrish in a BBC Two dramatisation of The Night Watch. Beginning in September 2012, she starred in the drama mini-series The Bletchley Circle (2012–2014). On 4 September 2012, she appeared in Jimmy McGovern's Accused.

In December 2013 she returned to the world of Jane Austen, starring as Elizabeth Darcy in the BBC Christmas season drama Death Comes to Pemberley, a three-part television adaptation of the P. D. James novel of the same name which continues the events of Austen's Pride and Prejudice six years after Darcy and Elizabeth's marriage, with a murder mystery plot involving the same characters.

In 2015, she played Mary Shelley in ITV drama series The Frankenstein Chronicles. In December that year she appeared as Ethel Rogers in the BBC three-part serial And Then There Were None, an adaptation of Agatha Christie's novel of the same name.

In 2017, she played Julia in The BBC comedy series Motherland. The show returned for a second series in 2019 and another in May 2021. The second and latest Christmas special, titled "Last Christmas" aired on 23 December 2022, garnering wholly positive reviews from critics.

In 2019, she played Beelzebub, leader of the denizens of Hell, in the Amazon Prime TV serial Good Omens, based on the book by Terry Pratchett and Neil Gaiman. In the same year she joined the cast of Line of Duty' during its fifth series playing DCS Patricia Carmichael, a role she reprised in series six.

In 2021, she played the co-lead role in Hollington Drive an ITV television drama series that began broadcasting on 29 September 2021. Created and written by Sophie Petzal, the series follows two sisters, Theresa (Anna Maxwell Martin) and Helen (Rachael Stirling), and their families as they grapple with the potential crime of their children.

In 2022, she hosted the seventh episode of the sixty-third series of Have I Got News for You alongside guest stars Chris McCausland and Steph McGovern and team captains Paul Merton and Ian Hislop.

Personal life
Martin married film director Roger Michell in 2010. The couple had two daughters (b. 2008/09 and 2010/11). In April 2020, Martin announced that the couple had separated. Michell died in September 2021.

Filmography

Film

Television

Stage

Readings and benefits
The Lady of Larkspur Lotion (rehearsed reading) as Mrs Hardwicke-Moore at the National Theatre (21 October 2002)
Hello from Bertha (rehearsed reading) as Goldie at the National Theatre (22 October 2002)
Collateral Damage II (poetry) at the National Theatre (14 March 2003)
Songs of Innocence and Experience (poetry) at the National Theatre (18 February 2004)
The Marriage of Heaven and Hell (poetry) at the National Theatre (25 February 2004)
Will and Lyra as herself (interview) at the National Theatre (26 March 2004)
After the Fire (rehearsed reading) at the National Theatre (7 March 2005)
The Black Glove (rehearsed reading) at the National Theatre (15 March 2005)
Snowbound (showcase) at the Royal National Theatre Studio (October 2005)
The Entertainer (rehearsed reading) as Jean at the Royal Court Theatre (16 January 2006)
Top Girls (reading) as Pope Joan at the Royal Court Theatre (19 September 2008)
Pencil (10-minute play in the 24 Hour Plays Celebrity Gala) at the Old Vic (1 November 2009)

Audio

Radio 
The Tall One as Samantha (BBC Radio 4, 1 to 5 September 2003)
The Raj Quartet as Daphne Manners (BBC Radio 4, 10 April to 5 June 2005)
The Ante Natal Clinic as Ros (BBC Radio 4, 19 January 2006)
The Sea as Rose (BBC Radio 4, 15 April 2006)
Great Expectations as Estella (BBC Radio 4, 6 and 13 August 2006)
The Invention of Childhood as one of several readers (BBC Radio 4, 25 September to 3 November 2006)
Berlin – Soundz Decadent as herself (BBC Radio 2, 2 January 2007)
Crooked House as Sophia Leonides (BBC Radio 4, 8 to 29 February 2008)
Words and Music: The Soft Machine as one of two poetry readers (BBC Radio 3, 1 June 2008)
The Portrait of a Lady as Isabel Archer (BBC Radio 4, 13 to 27 July 2008)
Villette as Lucy Snowe (BBC Radio 4, 3 to 7 and 10 to 14 August 2009)
Au Pairs as Dorika (BBC Radio 4, 7 to 11 September 2009)
Chekhov's Seven and a Half Years as Olga in Three Sisters (BBC Radio 3, 24 January 2010)
The New Radio 2 Arts Show with Claudia Winkleman as herself (BBC Radio 2, 15 March 2010)
Words and Music: Malady as one of two readers (BBC Radio 3, 11 April 2010)
The Wings of the Dove as Milly Theale (BBC Radio 4, 1, 8 and 15 August 2010)
The White Devil as Vittoria (BBC Radio 3, 15 August 2010)
Faust as Gretchen (BBC Radio 3, 19 September 2010)
Juvenile Jane as the extract reader (BBC Radio 4, 23 November 2010)

Audiobooks

Awards and nominations

References

External links
 
 Anna in His Dark Materials
 Article on HisDarkMaterials.org
 Sophie Heawood (26 August 2018), "Interview—Anna Maxwell Martin", The Observer.

1977 births
Living people
Alumni of the London Academy of Music and Dramatic Art
Best Actress BAFTA Award (television) winners
English film actresses
English stage actresses
English television actresses
English voice actresses
Alumni of the University of Liverpool
People from Beverley
Actresses from Yorkshire
21st-century English actresses